Boris Martynovich Shelkovnikov (1837 – 10 February 1878), was a Russian general of the imperial army.

A descendant of an old Armenian noble house he was born in Nukha (modern-day Shaki, Azerbaijan). He participated in the Crimean War. In 1865 in the Northern Caucasus, and in 1876 he was appointed as the commander of the Black Sea region. During the Russo-Turkish War of 1877–1878 Shelkovnikov stopped Turkish forces in their attack on Sochi and took Abkhazia after defeating the forces of Ahmed Muhtar Pasha in a battle near Aladzhi. He was awarded the Order of Saint George of the third degree on 27 October 1877 for his victory in Aladzhi.

Shelkovnikov's division met up with General Ivan Davidovich Lazarev and together they marched on the Turkish line to take the province of Erzerum on 2 October. Erzerum was taken the next day, and Shelkovnikov was made governor of the province.

After the occupation by Russian troops Erzurum region was its governor. Actively and vigorously set about it in its duties, but soon contracted typhus and died 10 February 1878.

References

1837 births
1878 deaths
People from Shaki, Azerbaijan
Imperial Russian Army generals
Russian people of the January Uprising
Russian military personnel of the Russo-Turkish War (1877–1878)
Recipients of the Order of St. George of the Third Degree
Russian people of Armenian descent
Russian nobility